Lorraine Regional Natural Park (French: Parc naturel régional de Lorraine) is a protected area of pastoral countryside in the Grand Est region of northeastern France, in the historic region of Lorraine. The parkland is split in two non-contiguous parcels of land between the cities of Metz and Nancy, and spans the three departments of Meuse, Meurthe-et-Moselle, and Moselle. According to the World Database on Protected Areas, it is an IUCN category V area.

Ancient ruins and modern monuments are common throughout the area. The land was officially designated a regional natural park in 1974.

The park is crossed by the LGV Est high speed rail line, with large viaducts.

Flora and fauna 
Animal species found in the park include badger, European wildcat, fox, polecat, roe deer, weasel, wild boar, and wolf, as well as a large variety of birds.

Forests are composed of beech and hardwoods such as maple, cherry and whitebeams. Sessile and pedunculate oaks are often accompanied by hornbeam. There are also ash trees, lime trees, alders, birches and aspens.

Member communes
There are 193 communes within the parkland boundaries.

 Albestroff • Ancy-sur-Moselle • Andilly • Ansauville • Apremont-la-Forêt • Arnaville • Assenoncourt • Avricourt • Azoudange 
 Bar-le-Duc • Bayonville-sur-Mad • Beaumont • Belles-Forêts • Belleville • Beney-en-Woëvre • Bernecourt • Blanche-Église • Boncourt-sur-Meuse • Bonzée • Bouconville-sur-Madt • Boucq • Bouillonville • Bourdonnay • Broussey-Raulecourt • Bruley • Bruville • Buxières-sous-les-Côtes
 Chaillon • Chambley-Bussières • Charey • Château-Voué • Combres-sous-les-Côtes 
 Dampvitoux • Desseling • Dieue-sur-Meuse • Dieulouard • Domèvre-en-Haye • Dommartin-la-Chaussée • Dommartin-la-Montagne • Dompierre-aux-Bois • Donnelay • Dornot
 Écrouves • Les Éparges • Essey-et-Maizerais • Euvezin • Euville
 Fénétrange • Fey-en-Haye • Flirey • Frémeréville-sous-les-Côtes • Fresnes-en-Woëvre • Fribourg
 Gelucourt • Génicourt-sur-Meuse • Geville • Gézoncourt • Girauvoisin • Givrycourt • Gondrexange • Gorze • Gravelotte • Griscourt • Grosrouvres • Guéblange-lès-Dieuze • Guermange
 Hagéville • Hamonville • Hampont • Han-sur-Meuse • Hannonville-sous-les-Côtes • Hannonville-Suzémont • Haraucourt-sur-Seille • Haudiomont • Herbeuville • Heudicourt-sous-les-Côtes
 Insviller
 Jaulny • Jezainville • Juvelize
 Lachaussée • Lacroix-sur-Meuse • Lagarde • Lagney • Lahayville •Lamorville • Laneuveville-derrière-Foug • Languimberg • Lidrezing • Limey-Remenauville • Lindre-Basse • Lironville • Loudrefing • Loupmont • Lucey
 Maidières • Maizières-lès-Vic • Mamey • Mandres-aux-Quatre-Tours • Manoncourt-en-Woëvre • Manonville • Marbache • Mars-la-Tour • Marsal • Martincourt • Mécrin • Ménil-la-Tour • Metz • Minorville • Mittersheim • Montauville • Morville-les-Vic • Mouilly • Moussey • Moyenvic • Mulcey • Munster
 Nancy • Nébing • Nonsard-Lamarche • Norroy-lès-Pont-à-Mousson • Novéant-sur-Moselle • Noviant-aux-Prés
 Obreck • Ommeray • Onville
 Pagney-derrière-Barine • Pagny-sur-Moselle • Pannes • Pont-sur-Meuse • Prény • Puxieux
 Rambucourt • Ranzières • Réchicourt-le-Château • Rembercourt-sur-Mad • Rening • Rezonville • Rhodes • Richecourt • Rogéville • Ronvaux • Rorbach-lès-Dieuze • Rosières-en-Haye • Rouvrois-sur-Meuse • Royaumeix • Rupt-en-Woëvre
 Saint-Julien-les-Gorze • Saint-Julien-sous-les-Côtes • Saint-Maurice-sous-les-Côtes • Saint-Médard • Saint-Remy-la-Calonne • Saizerais • Sanzey • Saulx-lès-Champlon • Seicheprey • Seuzey • Sommedieue • Sotzeling • Sponville
 Tarquimpol • Thiaucourt • Thillot • Tomblaine • Torcheville • Tremblecourt • Trésauvaux • Trondes • Tronville • Troyon
 Val-de-Bride • Valbois • Vandelainville • Varneville • Vaux • Vaux-les-Palameix • Vic-sur-Seille • Viéville-en-Haye • Vigneulles-lès-Hattonchâtel • Vignot • Vilcey-sur-Trey • Ville-sur-Yron • Villecey-sur-Mad • Villers-en-Haye • Villers-sous-Prény • Vionville
 Waville • Wuisse
 Xammes • Xivray-et-Marvoisin • Xonville
 Zarbeling • Zommange

See also
 List of regional natural parks of France
 Woëvre

References

External links

 Official park website 

Regional natural parks of France
Geography of Meuse (department)
Geography of Meurthe-et-Moselle
Geography of Moselle (department)
Protected areas established in 1974
Geography of Grand Est
Tourist attractions in Meurthe-et-Moselle
Tourist attractions in Meuse (department)
Tourist attractions in Moselle (department)
1974 establishments in France